জাহাজী (Navigator) is the debut studio album by Bangladeshi rock band Shironamhin. The album was recorded in Rabbit Communications Studio between 15 and 30 December 2003. It was released on 1 November 2004 by Rabbit Communications in Dhaka.

Two of the album's songs, "হাসিমুখ (Smile Face)" and "লাল নীল গল্প (Red Blue Story)", became long-term mainstays of the band's live set list, while other songs were performed live only a handful of times.

Background
Jahaji is based around the struggles of an urban lifestyle. The title track of the album states this. Shironamhin tried to portray the everyday life of a young middle-class career-seeking sailor in the Bronx. The cultural interest, the gossip in a crowded cityscape, the life of bu Dhaka.

Release
In 2004, Shironamhin completed the album Jahaji. At first, in 2004, the record label company Rabbit Communications released the album. Later Bangladeshi record label company G-Series reproduced & released it on 2005.

Track listing
Of the album's eleven songs, seven were written by Ziaur Rahman Zia, two were written by Tanzir Tuhin, and remaining were written by other members.

Personnel
 Tanzir Tuhin - lead vocal
 Ziaur Rahman Zia - bass
 Farhan Karim - Sarod, vocal
 Tushar - Guitar
 Jewel - Guitar
 Shafin - Drums

References

External links 
 

Shironamhin albums
2004 debut albums
Bengali music